Amar Choudary (born 4 January 1984), known professionally as Jiiva, is an Indian actor and film producer who works mainly in Tamil cinema and a few Hindi and Malayalam films. He is the youngest son of film producer R. B. Choudary. He began his career as a child actor in 1991 in films produced by his father. He made his debut as a lead actor in his father's 50th production, Aasai Aasaiyai (2003). After Sivaji Ganesan, Jiiva is the only Tamil actor to have been awarded at the Cyprus International Film Festival, particularly for his performance in Raam (2005).

After this, he has acted in other movies that have been successful, such as E (2006), Katradhu Tamizh (2007), Siva Manasula Sakthi (2009), Ko (2011), Nanban (2012), Mugamoodi (2012), Neethaane En Ponvasantham (2012), Endrendrum Punnagai (2013), Kalakalappu 2 (2018) and Kalathil Santhippom (2021). He made his Hindi cinema debut with the film 83 (2021), in which he portrayed cricketer Krishnamachari Srikkanth.

Early life 

Jiiva was born on 4 January 1984 in Chennai to Rajasthani-origin film producer R. B. Choudary and his wife Mahjabeen, a Tamilian. He is the youngest of four boys; his brothers are Suresh Choudary (co-producer in their home banner, Super Good Films), Jeevan Choudary (entrepreneur of a steel company), and Jithan Ramesh Choudary (actor and producer). R. B. Choudary is a noted independent south Indian film producer (Super Good Films) who has been a launchpad for now-famous directors and actors.

Jiiva is fluent in Tamil and English, and can also speak limited Hindi.

Career

2003–2008: Debut and breakthrough 

Jiiva made his debut in his father's production (Super Good Films), Aasai Aasaiyai, directed by Ravi Mariya in 2003. The film performed averagely at the box office, but critics felt that Jiiva left an impression.

His second film Thithikudhe (the Tamil remake of Uday Kiran's Telugu movie Manasantha Nuvve) which also released in the same year was also produced by Super Good Films. The film opened to mixed reviews but the actor gained appreciation for his good looks and expressive emotions. It was his third movie, Ameer's crime thriller, Raam (2005) that was called a 'dream break' for his calling in the film industry. The racy screenplay and his role of an eccentric 17-year-old gained positive feedback from audience and critics. The movie was screened at the International Film Festival in Goa and later at the Cyprus International Film Festival, where he won the Best Actor award.

Jiiva next starred in Dishyum (2006), opposite Sandhya of Kaadhal fame. "A feel-good movie for youngsters", reviewed various local publications. "Jeeva continues from this point and has matured as an actor. His acting is impeccable and natural; his emoting, expressions, emotions expressed by looks, body-language – all are perfect," remarked Galatta. The same year, he made his debut as an NSG Commando in Malayalam cinema with Major Ravi's film Keerthi Chakra (2006) starring Mohanlal. The movie had a great opening and was one of the highest-grossing Malayalam films of the year. Jiiva also won the Best Pair Award along with Gopika at Asianet Film Awards. "Jeeva the Tamil actor has a more heroic role which he has done with felicity. The physical energy he imparts to the role has to be seen to be believed," wrote Sify. Later, the movie was dubbed and released in Tamil as Aran. His last movie in 2006 was E, where he portrayed the role of a slum dweller, opposite Nayanthara.The film received positive reviews and was a commercial hit.

The release of Kattradhu Thamizh (2007), which turned out to be a super hit. Jiiva had two more releases after that, Rameswaram in 2007 and Thenavattu in 2008.

2009–2014: Commercial success and critical acclaim 
Among his releases in the 2000s, Jiiva garnered the most appreciation for portraying various roles that were critically and commercially successful. In 2009, Jiiva experienced major commercial success with Director Rajesh's maiden venture, Siva Manasula Sakthi (2009), opposite Anuya, still hailed as one of the best romantic comedies of all time and has since become a cult rom-com in the Tamil film industry. In 2010, he signed up with Super Good Films for a movie titled Kacheri Arambam, which was described as entertaining, action-packed and comical by various news channels (Behindwoods, Indiaglitz,  IANS)

His next film was Singam Puli (2011), where he played dual roles, following which K. V. Anand's political thriller Ko (2011) with Karthika Nair as the lead-role actress and Piaa Bajpai in a supporting role. Rediff stated that his role as Ashwin in Ko was a "cake-walk for Jiiva: he's had a ball with the camera, clicking shots in almost impossible situations and making sure his trademark effervescence is present at all times", while Sify said that "with this performance he was going to be a force to reckon with in Tamil cinema". His next films were Rowthiram (2011), directed by Gokul, and Vandhaan Vendraan (2011) by R. Kannan, released in quick succession. In fact, in Rowthiram, his agility in action sequences is very impressive."

In 2012, he appeared in S. Shankar's comedy-drama Nanban (a remake of the Bollywood blockbuster 3 Idiots). Jiiva reprised the role of Sharman Joshi in the Tamil version as Sevarkodi Senthil and starred alongside Vijay, and Srikanth. At the cost of 550 million (INR), it was one of the most expensive films to be made at that point, and was released on Pongal in 622 screens worldwide. The movie received highly positive reviews and became a blockbuster. Malathi Rangarajan of The Hindu stated, "As for Jiiva, you give him characters with scope and he delivers".
His next project was Mysskin's Mugamoodi (2012), the first ever Tamil superhero movie. Reports claimed that Jiiva underwent special training at Mansuria Kung Fu YMCA, Nandanam, Chennai, the same place where he had trained in Kung-Fu for a few years before venturing into movies. High-end gadgets were used in the film, designed by the Indian Institutes of Technology (IIT), while teams from the National Institute of Fashion Technology (NIFT) created the costumes and looks of the characters. It is said that Jiiva's super hero costume, designed by Gabriella Wilkins, weighed more than 10 kg. 

The movie opened to positive reviews, and a few cited it as "different and refreshing". The movie received much attention from children. Jiiva received appreciation from critics for his role as Lee. "The titular role fits Jiiva well, very much like the armour he dons. But your heart goes out to him — performing stunts in a costume that looks unbearably heavy, with a face-mask to boot must have been quite a task," commented The Hindu review. Firstpost called Jiiva's role a "rewarding performance". "Jiiva has obviously given his best, and his martial arts sequences are worthy of applause," said Rediff.

Jiiva's next venture was Gautham Vasudev Menon's Neethaane En Ponvasantham (2012), starring opposite Samantha Ruth Prabhu. The film had an average run at the box office. Critics and audiences felt that the actor brought dignity to the screen as Varun Krishnan. After this, he worked on Bejoy Nambiar's David (2013) alongside Vikram, which garnered positive reviews, but failed at the box office. His next movie was Endrendrum Punnagai, where he was paired with Trisha for the first time. The film, based on friendship, was a commercial success. In 2014, he worked in cinematographer Ravi K. Chandran's directorial debut Yaan. Despite the pre-release hype, the film received negative reviews and was a box office failure.

2015–present: Challenges and comeback 

Jiiva took a break for a year in 2015 and returned with three releases in 2016. He starred in his 25th film Pokkiri Raja, which opened to mixed to negative reviews. His next film was the long delayed Thirunaal in which he united with Nayantara for the second time. He was next seen in a romantic comedy, Kavalai Vendam (2016), directed by Deekay, where he was paired opposite Kajal Aggarwal. The movie had mixed reviews. "Jiiva seems like the perfect choice for the role, being effortlessly flippant, funny and intensely emotional", said Rediff.com's review.

His 2017 release, Sangili Bungili Kadhava Thorae, a horror comedy by debut director Ike, received a mixed reviews to positive reviews and performed well at the box office. His next movie was Kalakalappu 2 (2018), directed by Sundar C., released in February. Jiiva was seen alongside Shiva, Jai, Nikki Galrani and Catherine Tresa. A comedy entertainer, the movie received mixed reviews but performed well at the box office and was a super hit.

Jiiva's next film  Kee, a cyber thriller, released in May 2019 was received with mixed reviews, had an average run at the box-office. Jiiva's next film Gorilla, directed by Don Sandy released in July 2019. This film had a chimpanzee in a key role which was the first ever instance in Indian film history. It was also revealed that the chimpanzee named Kong was hired from the Samut training station of Thailand. Most of the sequences related to the chimpanzee were shot in Thailand and the remaining portions were shot in Chennai.

In 2020, he starred in the action movie Seeru followed by the romance Gypsy. In 2021, he appeared in the multistarrer drama, Kalathil Santhippom which received positive reviews. He acted in Kabir Khan's Hindi film 83, playing the role of Kris Srikkanth.  In 2022, he was seen in the romantic comedy drama Coffee with Kadhal and Varalaru Mukkiyam.

Other work
Jiiva was a judge on STAR Vijay's reality dance competition Jodi Number One in its third season along with Sangeetha and Aishwarya Rajinikanth. He was also a judge on Astro's Yuttha Medai All Stars Grand Finals in Malaysia.

Filmography

All films are in Tamil, unless otherwise noted.

As an actor

in Television

Voice actor

References

External links

 
 

Living people
Indian male film actors
Tamil male actors
1984 births
21st-century Indian male actors
Male actors in Tamil cinema
Male actors from Chennai